Valley Hill may refer to:

 Valley Hill, Mississippi in Carroll County
 Valley Hill, North Carolina in Henderson County